Alexander Andreyevich Svechin (17 August 1878 – 28 July 1938) was a Russian and Soviet military leader, military writer, educator and theorist, and author of the military classic "Strategy".

Early life 
He was born in Odessa, where his father was a general in the Imperial Russian Army. He was of Russian ethnicity. His elder brother Mikhail Svechin (1876–1969) was a cavalry officer in the cuirassiers who fought in the Russo-Japanese War and World War I, joined the White movement in the Russian Civil War and died in France in 1969.

He studied at St. Petersburg Cadet Corps, then in the Mikhailovsky Artillery School. He graduated from the General Staff Academy in 1903.

Career
He participated in the Russo-Japanese War of 1904-1905 as a Company Commander in the 22nd Eastern Siberian Regiment, and subsequently as a staff officer at the headquarters of the 16th Army Corps, and a staff officer at the headquarters of the 3rd Manchurian Army.

After the start of World War I, he was assigned the command of the 5th Finland Rifle Regiment, and was later named Chief of Staff of the 7th Infantry Division, commander of the Black Sea Marine Division, major general in 1916 and finally chief of staff of the Russian 5th Army.

Following the October Revolution, in March 1918, he joined the Bolsheviks and was immediately appointed military commander of the Smolensk region. He rose to become the head of the All-Russian General Staff.

In October 1918, Following disagreements with the Soviet commander-in-chief Jukums Vācietis, Svechin was removed from his position and appointed professor at the Academy of General Staff of the Workers' and Peasants' Red Army. The new position enabled Svechin to combine his talent as a writer with his knowledge of military strategy.  His work Strategy became required reading at Soviet military schools.

In February 1931, in a purge of former czarist officers in the Red Army, Svechin was arrested and sentenced to 5 years imprisonment in the gulags. However, in February 1932, he was released and returned to active duty as a divisional commander in the Red Army. He was posted first at the intelligence agency of the General Staff and then at the Academy of General Staff of the Red Army.

Death
He died as a result of the Great Purge. He was arrested again on 30 December 1937. His name was included in death list No. 107, dated 26 July 1938 and signed by Joseph Stalin and Vyacheslav Molotov. On 29 July 1938, he was sentenced to death by the Military Collegium of the Supreme Court of the USSR on charges of "participating in a counter-revolutionary organization" and "training terrorists".

According to Alexander Hill, Svechin was executed on 29 August 1938, and his body was buried in the Moscow region of Kommunarka. However, the French edition of Aleksandr Solzhenitsyn's The Gulag Archipelago gives 1935 as the year of his execution. 

He was rehabilitated on 8 September 1956.

His name appears in Aleksandr Solzhenitsyn's cycle of novels The Red Wheel.

Works 
 Strategy, edited by Kent D. Lee; introductory essays by Andrei A. Kokoshin et al.; Minneapolis, MN: East View Publications; 1992 edition;  
 "The Art of Regiment Leadership", Moscow, 1930 (in Russian)

References

Further reading
 "Misreading Svechin: Attrition, Annihilation, and Historicism" by David R. Stone, The Journal of Military History No. 76, July 2012, pp. 673–693

1878 births
1938 deaths
Military personnel from Odesa
Imperial Russian Army generals
Military theorists
Historians from the Russian Empire
Russian military personnel of the Russo-Japanese War
Russian military personnel of World War I
Military writers from the Russian Empire
People of the Russian Civil War
Recipients of the Order of St. George of the Third Degree
Russian people executed by the Soviet Union
Great Purge victims from Russia